Over the years, a variety of bands have made up the yearly lineups of Ozzfest, a yearly heavy metal music festival that usually tours the United States in summer.

Ozzfest 1996

Line-up

Main stage
 Ozzy Osbourne
 Slayer
 Danzig
 Biohazard
 Sepultura
 Fear Factory
 Neurosis
 Narcotic Gypsy

2nd stage

 Earth Crisis
 Powerman 5000
 Coal Chamber
 Cellophane
 King Norris

Tour dates

Ozzfest 1997

Line-up

Main stage
 Black Sabbath 
 Ozzy Osbourne
 Marilyn Manson (Added to the line-up on June 15)
 Pantera
 Type O Negative
 Fear Factory
 Machine Head

2nd stage
 Powerman 5000

 Coal Chamber
 Slo Burn
 Drain STH
 downset.
 Neurosis
 Vision of Disorder

"That whole tour was like the Morbid Tour – it was a funeral on wheels," quipped Sabbath bassist Geezer Butler. "Every band was wearing black." "I'd have liked to have done a long set, as opposed to fifty minutes or an hour," remarked guitarist Tony Iommi. "For me it didn't feel like we'd done enough."

Tour dates

The Columbus show was cancelled when Osbourne lost his voice. "They wanted me to go on and announce that Ozzy wasn't going to be there," Tony Iommi recalled. "I said, 'You've got no chance of that!' There was no way I'm walking out there saying we're not playing… Pantera were a particularly great bunch of guys and they went out and jammed away. Ozzy's band as well – they were nice people. When they [the audience] were told that we weren't going to be playing at the end and Ozzy wasn't going to be showing up, they just fucking wrecked the place… We had to reschedule it [for July 1]."

Ozzfest 1998

United Kingdom line-up

Main stage
 Black Sabbath
 Ozzy Osbourne
 Foo Fighters
 Pantera
 Soulfly
 Slayer
 Fear Factory
 Therapy? (Replaced Korn)
 Korn (Canceled)

2nd stage
Coal Chamber
 Life of Agony
 Human Waste Project
 Hed PE
 Entombed
 Pitchshifter

United States line-up

Line-up

Main stage
 Ozzy Osbourne
 Tool
 Megadeth
 Limp Bizkit
 Soulfly
 Sevendust
 Coal Chamber
 System of a Down

2nd stage

 Motörhead
 Melvins
 Incubus
 Snot 
 Ultraspank
 Life of Agony
 Kilgore
 Monster Voodoo Machine

Tour dates

Information
The concert on July 18, 1998 at Float Rite Park was merged with Warped Tour 1998. Some 39,000 fans were at the 12-hour, six-stage, 48-band event.

Ozzfest 1999

Line-up

Main stage
 Black Sabbath
 Rob Zombie
 Deftones
 Slayer
 Primus featuring Buckethead
 System of a Down
 Godsmack
 Pantera

2nd stage
 Drain STH
 Fear Factory
 Static-X
 Hed PE
 Pushmonkey
 Slipknot
 Puya
 Flashpoint
 Apartment 26
 Kittie

Tour dates

Ozzfest 2000

Line-up

Main stage
 Ozzy Osbourne
 Pantera
 Godsmack
 Static-X
 Incubus
 Methods of Mayhem
 P.O.D.
 Queens of the Stone Age (Cancelled August 24–30)
 Black Label Society (Started August 24)
 Apartment 26 (Started August 4)

2nd stage
 Soulfly
 Kittie
 Disturbed
 Taproot
 Slaves on Dope
 Reveille
 Shuvel
 Primer 55
 The Deadlights
 Pitchshifter
 Crazy Town (until July 6)
 Pumpjack (started August 4)

The lineup on the Main Stage and 2nd Stage change shortly after the tour began when Crazy Town was pulled from the tour by the band's manager. Where as Disturbed was moved to open the Main Stage.

Tour dates

Ozzfest 2001

United Kingdom

Main stage
 Black Sabbath
 Slipknot
 Tool
 Papa Roach
 Soulfly
 Hed PE
 Raging Speedhorn

2nd stage
 Disturbed
 Amen
 Mudvayne
 Black Label Society
 Pure Rubbish
 Apartment 26
 The Union Underground

United States

Main stage
 Black Sabbath 
 Marilyn Manson (cancelled on 06/16)
 Slipknot
 Papa Roach
 Linkin Park
 Disturbed
 Crazy Town
 Black Label Society

2nd stage
 Mudvayne (cancelled on July 25)
 The Union Underground (cancelled on June 30)
 Taproot
 Systematic (last show on July 13)
 Nonpoint
 Drowning Pool (cancelled on June 30)
 Spineshank (started on June 30)
 Hatebreed (cancelled on June 18)
 American Head Charge(replaced by Slaves on Dope on July 24)

Streetwise Stage
 Godhead (last show on June 30)
 Otep (last show on July 13)
 No One (Started on July 14) (replaced by Project Wyze on July 24)
 Pure Rubbish (cancelled on June 25)
 Beautiful Creatures
 Pressure 4-5 (Started July 14)

Tour dates

Ozzfest 2002

Germany & Belgium line-ups

May 17–18
 Ozzy Osbourne
 Tool
 System of a Down
 Bad Religion
 P.O.D.
 Drowning Pool
 Black Label Society

May 20
 Ozzy Osbourne
 Tool
 Bad Religion
 Black Label Society
 Oomph!
 Such a Surge

May 23
 Ozzy Osbourne
 Tool
 System of a Down

England

Main stage
 Ozzy Osbourne
 Tool
 System of a Down
 Slayer
 Lostprophets
 Millencolin
 Cradle of Filth
 Drowning Pool
 The Mad Capsule Markets
 Black Label Society
 AntiProduct

2nd stage
 Hundred Reasons
 Ill Niño
 Kittie
 American Head Charge
 Mushroomhead
 Otep
 Cyclefly
 Hell is for Heroes
 Danko Jones
 Flaw
 Skindred
 Nonpoint
 Pulse Ultra

Ireland

Main stage
 Ozzy Osbourne (cancelled)
 Tool
 System of a Down
 Slayer
 Therapy?
 Lostprophets
 Drowning Pool
 Cyclefly
 Black Label Society

2nd stage
 Kittie
 American Head Charge
 Ill Niño
 Mushroomhead
 Hell Is for Heroes
 Pulse Ultra
 Flaw
 Otep
 AntiProduct
 Skindive
 Superskin

Poland & Czech Republic

May 29
 Ozzy Osbourne
 Tool
 Slayer
 AntiProduct
 Decapitated

May 30
 Ozzy Osbourne
 Slayer
 Tool
 Drowning Pool
 Metalium
 Royal Playboy Cartel
 Black Label Society
 Škwor
 AntiProduct
 Astro Metro

Netherlands

Main stage
 Ozzy Osbourne
 Tool
 Slayer
 Within Temptation
 Kittie
 Ill Niño
 Drowning Pool

2nd stage
 American Head Charge
 Dreadlock Pussy
 Mushroomhead
 SOiL
 .calibre
 After Forever
 Otep
 AntiProduct

Local Stage
 Nomen
 Outburst
 Wicked Mystic
 Callenish Circle
 Dimension Seven
 Smogus
 Agresión

Portugal
 Ozzy Osbourne (cancelled)
 Tool
 Slayer
 Ill Niño
 Kittie
 Drowning Pool
 AntiProduct
 500 & Crave
 Ramp

United States

Main stage
 Ozzy Osbourne
 System of a Down
 Rob Zombie
 P.O.D.
 Drowning Pool (cancelled on August 14 after death of lead singer Dave Williams)
 Adema
 Black Label Society
 Tommy Lee (started August 22)

2nd stage
 Down
 Hatebreed
 Meshuggah
 Soil (Ended on August 8)
 Flaw (Ended August 8)
 3rd Strike (Ended August 8)
 Pulse Ultra
 Ill Niño
 Andrew W.K. (Ended August 10)
 Glassjaw (Started August 10)
 The Used (Started August 11)
 Switched (Started August 10)
 Otep
 Lostprophets
 The Apex Theory
 Neurotica
 Chevelle
 Mushroomhead (Started August 10)
 Seether (Started August 10 + Appeared July 13)

Tour dates

Ozzfest 2003
Main stage:
Ozzy Osbourne, Korn, Marilyn Manson, Disturbed, Chevelle, The Datsuns  (on select dates)
Second stage:
Cradle of Filth, Voivod, Hotwire, Shadows Fall, Grade 8 (through August 11), Twisted Method, Nothingface, Killswitch Engage, Ünloco, Depswa (through August 11), Motograter, Sworn Enemy, The Revolution Smile, Chimaira, Endo, Memento, E.Town Concrete (started August 14)

Ozzfest 2004
Main stage:
Black Sabbath, Judas Priest, Slayer, Dimmu Borgir, Superjoint Ritual, Black Label Society
Second stage:
Slipknot, Hatebreed, Lamb of God, Atreyu, Bleeding Through, Lacuna Coil, Every Time I Die, Unearth, God Forbid, Otep, Devildriver, Magna-Fi, Throwdown, Darkest Hour, Disown

Ozzfest 2005

UK (Download Festival)
The Saturday (11 June) of the Download Festival at Donington Park was dubbed "Ozzfest Day", featuring Black Sabbath, Velvet Revolver, HIM, Anthrax, Alter Bridge, A, Bowling for Soup, The Mad Capsule Markets, The Dwarves and Trivium.

United States
Main stage:
Black Sabbath, Iron Maiden (from July 15 – August 20), Mudvayne, Shadows Fall, Black Label Society, In Flames, Velvet Revolver (from August 23 – September 4), Slipknot (July 31 and August 20 only), Drowning Pool (August 25 only), 
Second stage:
Rob Zombie, Killswitch Engage, As I Lay Dying, Mastodon, A Dozen Furies, The Haunted, Arch Enemy, The Black Dahlia Murder, Bury Your Dead, It Dies Today, Soilwork, Gizmachi, Wicked Wisdom, Trivium

Ozzfest 2006
Main stage:
Ozzy Osbourne (on select dates), System of a Down,  Disturbed, Avenged Sevenfold (cancelled August 13), Hatebreed (cancelled August 9 and 13), Lacuna Coil, DragonForce
Second stage:
Ozzy Osbourne (on select dates), Black Label Society,Atreyu, Unearth, Bleeding Through, Norma JeanFluffy Pink Bunnies
Second Stage (rotating slots):
A Life Once Lost, The Red Chord, Walls of Jericho, Strapping Young Lad, All That Remains, Full Blown Chaos, Between the Buried and Me, Bad Acid Trip

Ozzfest 2007
Main stage
Ozzy Osbourne, Lamb of God, Static-X, Lordi, Black Tide (started August 10)
Second stage
Hatebreed, Behemoth, Nick Oliveri and the Mondo Generator (July 12–22), DevilDriver (started August 2), Egypt Central (August 2–8)
Second stage (rotating slots)
Nile, Ankla, The Showdown, 3 Inches of Blood, DÅÅTH, In This Moment, Chthonic, Circus Diablo

Ozzfest 2008
Main stage
Metallica, Ozzy Osbourne, Serj Tankian, Hellyeah, Jonathan Davis, Cavalera Conspiracy, Shadows Fall, Apocalyptica, In This Moment, All Star Dimebag Darrell Tribute
Second stage
Sevendust, DevilDriver, Kingdom of Sorrow, Soilent Green, Witchcraft, Goatwhore
Texas stage
The Sword, Drowning Pool, Rigor Mortis, The Destro, Within Chaos, Debri, Black Tooth

Ozzfest 2010

United States

Main stage
Ozzy Osbourne, Mötley Crüe, Halford, Devildriver, Nonpoint
Second stage
Black Label Society (cancelled August 22 and August 24), Drowning Pool (cancelled August 24), Kingdom of Sorrow (cancelled August 14)
Second stage (rotating slots):
Goatwhore (cancelled August 21), Skeletonwitch, Saviours, Kataklysm (cancelled August 24), Exodus (August 14 only), California Wildebeest (August 14 only), and Immune (August 14 only)

United Kingdom
Main stage
Ozzy Osbourne, Korn, Murderdolls, Steel Panther, Skindred
Second stage
Paradise Lost, Black Spiders, Revoker, Jettblack

Israel

Main stage
Ozzy Osbourne, Korn, Soulfly and Betzefer.
Second stage
Almana Shchora, Behind the Sun and Tal Friedman and his band the Krayot.

Ozzfest Japan 2013
May 11
Slipknot, Slash featuring Myles Kennedy and the Conspirators, Deftones, Maximum the Hormone, Man with a Mission, Fear, and Loathing in Las Vegas, The Treatment, Namba 69, crossfaith, Galneryus, Momoiro Clover Z, Knock Out Monkey, and Artema
May 12 
Black Sabbath, Tool, Stone Sour, Dir En Grey, Anthem, coldrain, Steel Panther, Mucc, AA=, Ningen Isu, Head Phones President, and fade

Ozzfest Japan 2015
November 21
Korn, Evanescence, Bullet for My Valentine, Noisemaker, VAMPS, ONE OK ROCK, Crossfaith, Corey Taylor,
MEANING, Crystal Lake, and SiM

  *OPENING ACTS :Wrong City, NoisyCell, The Winking Owl, Unveil Raze

November 22 
Ozzy and Friends, Jane's Addiction, Hatebreed, A Day to Remember, Black Label Society, Babymetal, Fear, and Loathing in Las Vegas, 9mm Parabellum Bullet, Her Name in Blood, Ningen Isu, and OLDCODEX

  *OPENING ACTS : Animetal the Second, A Crowd of Rebellion, Kanojo in the Display, SALTY DOG

Ozzfest Meets Knotfest 2016

Ozzfest
Lemmy Stage
Black Sabbath, Disturbed, Megadeth, Opeth, Black Label Society, Rival Sons
Monster Energy Stages 1 and 2
Suicidal Tendencies, Hatebreed, DevilDriver, Goatwhore, Huntress
Nuclear Blast stage
Municipal Waste, Kataklysm, The Shrine, Still Rebel, Allegaeon, Brujeria

Knotfest
Lemmy Main Stage
Slipknot, Slayer, Amon Amarth, Anthrax, Trivium, Motionless in White
Rockstar Stages 1 and 2
Sabaton, Suicide Silence, Overkill, Emmure, Butcher Babies, Man with a Mission
Nuclear Blast Stage
Whitechapel, Combichrist, Death Angel, Carnifex, Loathe, SiM, ONI

Ozzfest Meets Knotfest 2017

Ozzfest
Main Stage
Ozzy Osbourne, Prophets of Rage, Deftones, Children of Bodom, Orange Goblin
Second Stage
Kreator, Baroness, High on Fire, Iron Reagan, 1349, Havok, Kyng, Tombs, Night Demon, Thrown Into Exile 
Nuclear Blast stage
Possessed, Suffocation, Fallujah, Rings of Saturn

Knotfest
Main Stage
Rob Zombie, Marilyn Manson, Stone Sour, Eighteen Visions, Prayers
Second Stage
Testament, Life of Agony, The Black Dahlia Murder, Upon a Burning Body, Goatwhore, Death Angel, Code Orange, Oni, Stitched Up Heart, Ded 
Nuclear Blast Stage
Sid Wilson, Repulsion, Exhumed, Warbringer, Ghoul

Ozzfest 2018

Line-up

Main stage
 Ozzy Osbourne
 Rob Zombie
 Marilyn Manson
 Jonathan Davis
 Body Count

2nd stage
 Zakk Sabbath
 DevilDriver
 Wednesday 13

Guest appearances
Ron Jeremy – introduced Coal Chamber before their set in 1996.  Can be seen on the Ozzfest Live VHS (discontinued).
Phil Anselmo – performed the song "Kill All The White People" with Type O Negative in 1997 at the Glen Helen Amphitheater in San Bernardino, CA.
Henry Rollins – preceded the main stage with a spoken-word performance in 1997.
Benji Webbe (ex-Dub War/Skindred) – appeared with Soulfly at their UK dates in 1998.
Kerry King (Slayer) Performed Thunderkiss with Rob Zombie on June 16, 1999 at the Meadows Music Theater in Hartford Connecticut.
Buckethead – played a few songs with Primus during their set on the Main stage in 1999, and did various stunts such as doing the "robot" and swinging around nunchaku.
Evan Seinfeld – sang with Pantera on "Walk" in 2000 at the PNC Bank Arts Center.
Verne Troyer – actor who played Mini Me, appeared onstage with Pantera at Pine Knob (now DTE Energy Music Theater) in Clarkston, Mi on July 12, 2000.
Dino Cazares – joined Soulfly to perform "Eye For An Eye" at Ozzfest 2000.
David Draiman – joined Memento to perform "Stare" at Ozzfest 2003 in Scranton, Pennsylvania.
Corey Taylor – joined Soulfly to perform "Jumpdafuckup" at Ozzfest UK 2001, and also joined SiM to perform a cover of Radiohead's song "Creep" at Ozzfest Japan 2015.
Tom Araya – joined Soulfly to perform "Terrorist" at Ozzfest UK 2001.
John Dolmayan – appeared with Tool in 2002 at the Antwerp and Dublin dates, performing "Triad."
George Oosthoek (ex-Orphanage) – appeared with Within Temptation during "The Other Half (Of Me)" at Nijmegen in 2002.
Dave Lombardo – appeared with Slayer at Nijmegen in 2002 (filling in for Paul Bostaph who had an elbow injury) and also with Tool.
Mike Bordin – performed with Tool at Donington and Nijmegen in 2002.
Zakk Wylde – performed with Soil on "Halo" in 2002.
Kelly Osbourne – performed with Andrew W.K. on "She Is Beautiful" in 2002.
John Tardy and Frank Watkins performed a mini-set of Obituary songs at Ozzfest 2002 in West Palm Beach, Florida with Andrew W.K. and his band. Obituary drummer Donald Tardy was Andrew's touring drummer at the time.
Dimebag Darrell and Vinnie Paul joined Disturbed onstage at Ozzfest 2003 in Alpine Valley, Wisconsin and played guitar and drums respectively for a version of "Walk"
Rob Halford – appeared with Black Sabbath on August 26, 2004 in Camden, replacing an ill Ozzy.
Howard Jones – appeared with Throwdown in 2004.
Will Smith and Jada Pinkett Smith – appeared with Bury Your Dead in 2005.
Harry Perry during the 2006 Ozzfests, would play sets with System of a Down.  He was also seen playing his guitar with a portable amp around the venues during the second stage performances.
Candace Kucsulain of Walls of Jericho appeared with In This Moment in 2007.
John 5 appeared with Static-X in 2007.
Randy Blythe from Lamb of God joined Hatebreed to perform "Perseverance" and "Doomsayer" at Ozzfest 2007.
Kevin Talley filled in on drums for Devildriver
King Diamond joined Metallica at Ozzfest 2008 and performed a medley of "Evil", "Curse of the Pharaohs", "Satan's Fall", "A Corpse Without a Soul", and "Into the Coven." This medley also appeared on  Metallica's Garage Inc. cover album, as the track "Mercyful Fate."
Chester Bennington joined Disturbed in 2001 to perform a cover of Pantera's "Walk".
 Buzz Osborne from the Melvins played guitar on a few songs with Tool during their performance in 1998.
 Yuto Miyazawa joined Ozzy Osbourne at Ozzfest 2010 for the first 6 shows to play "Crazy Train"
 Drowning Pool joined Nonpoint to play "Miracale" and "Bodies" at Ozzfest 2010 on August 24.
 Branden Schieppati of Bleeding Through appeared onstage with Avenged Sevenfold at the Chicago date of Ozzfest 2006 to perform their cover of Pantera's "Walk".
 Nikki Sixx  of Mötley Crüe joined Rob Zombie & Marilyn Manson at Ozzfest 2018 for a cover of The Beatles Helter Skelter.
 Dino Cazares guitarist of Fear Factory performed a song with Slayer right after a set with Fear Factory in San Antonio, Texas at Retama Park July 11, 1999.
Fluff Pink Bunnies 2005 battle of the bands winners to perform at 4 shows

References

Concert tours
Heavy metal festivals in the United States
Recurring events established in 1996
Ozzy Osbourne concert tours
Ozzfest